Bertil Vilhelm Rönnmark (24 December 1905 – 1 April 1967) was a Swedish rifle sports shooter who competed in the 1932 Summer Olympics and in the 1936 Summer Olympics.

In 1932 he won the gold medal in the 50 metre rifle prone event.

Four years later he finished eighth in the 50 metre rifle prone competition.

References

External links
 profile

1905 births
1967 deaths
Swedish male sport shooters
Olympic shooters of Sweden
ISSF rifle shooters
Shooters at the 1932 Summer Olympics
Shooters at the 1936 Summer Olympics
Olympic gold medalists for Sweden
Olympic medalists in shooting
Medalists at the 1932 Summer Olympics
20th-century Swedish people